Dhamani is a village in Ambegaon taluka of Pune District in the state of Maharashtra, India. The village is administrated by a Sarpanch who is an elected representative of village as per constitution of India and Panchayati raj (India).

Geographical location and population 
Dhamani is in Ambegaon Taluka, Pune District. There are 1384 males and 1430 females. There are 181 Scheduled Castes and 42 Scheduled Tribes. The census index of this village is 55551.

Literacy 
 Total literate population: 2075 (73.74%)
 Literate male population: 1139 (82.3%)
 Literate female population: 936 (65.45%)

Educational Facility 
 The village has 1 government pre-primary school.
 There is one government district primary school in the village.
 There is 1 Government Higher Secondary and Secondary School in the village.
 The nearest degree college (Pabal) is more than 10 kilometers away.
 The nearest College of Engineering (Avsari) is more than 10 kilometers away.
 The nearest medical college (Pune) is more than 10 kms away.
 The nearest management institute (Pune) is at a distance of more than 10 kms.
 The nearest polytechnic is located at a distance of more than 10 kms.
 The nearest Vocational Training School (Ghodegaon) is more than 10 kms away.
 The nearest Informal Training Center (Pune) is more than 10 kms away.
 The nearest special school for the disabled (Pabal) is more than 10 km away.
 The village has 1 other private educational facility.

Medical Facility (Government) 
There is 1 government hospital center in the village.

The nearest community health center is more than 15 kilometers away.
The village has 1 Primary Health Center.
The nearest primary health sub-center is more than 15 km away.
The village has 1  Maternity and Child Welfare Center at Manchar.
The nearest Alternative Medicine Hospital is more than 10 km away.
There is 1 hospital in the village.
The nearest veterinary hospital
There is 1 family welfare center in the village.

Hygiene 
There is no sewerage system in the village. The village has open sewerage system. Sewage is discharged directly into water bodies. The entire area is involved in a clean-up operation. There is no public toilet in the village with bathroom.

References 

Villages in Pune district